"Do You" is a 2007 single by American singer-songwriter Ne-Yo. It is about Ne-Yo questioning his ex-girlfriend if she ever thinks about him anymore. It is the second single from his second album, Because of You. The single was officially released to radio the week of June 12, 2007. In an interview with BET, Ne-Yo said that "Do You" is the second part to his song "So Sick" from his debut album, In My Own Words.

"Do You" was released on July 30 in the UK as a download only single, despite receiving more video play than follow-up single "Can We Chill" (which received a physical release), resulting in a lower chart position of number 100 there, his lowest charting single.

Ne-Yo premiered "Do You" on BET's Access Granted on May 23, 2007.

Remixes
Two duet remixes of the song have been released, both versions featuring the non-male singer singing the second verse with different lyrics: one with fellow American R&B singer Mary J. Blige and the other with Japanese American pop singer Hikaru Utada. Utada's version was released digitally in Japan on November 21, 2007, as their 7th English single (their 27th single overall). The version with Utada was included on the Ne-Yo: The Collection Japanese compilation.

Music video
The video was directed by Melina Matsoukas. It begins with Ne-Yo writing a letter to his ex, asking if she remembers him. It is seemingly difficult, as he crumples up a piece of paper and throws them away. The video cuts to him arguing with his girlfriend, who then leaves the car. He  She moves on, getting engaged, and births a baby girl. She's then shown on a couch kissing her new boyfriend and lying on his lap, at the same time distant. Ne-Yo then remembers a memory where he is kissing her on the same couch. He then drives and stops at a pay phone and calls his ex to come to the pay phone. But by the time she arrives, he has already left. At the end she imagines herself reuniting with Ne-Yo, picturing them kissing, hugging, and caressing.

Formats and track listings
12" Vinyl
Side A
 "Do You" (radio edit)
 "Do You" (instrumental)
Side B
"Ain't Thinking About You" (radio edit)
"Ain't Thinking About You" (instrumental)

UK Promo
 "Do You"
 "Do You" (instrumental)

Planned UK track listing
 "Do You"
 "Because of You" (remix) (featuring Kanye West)

Japanese Digital
 "Do You" (featuring Utada)

Charts

Weekly charts

Year-end charts

References

2007 singles
Hikaru Utada songs
Ne-Yo songs
Music videos directed by Melina Matsoukas
Def Jam Recordings singles
Pop ballads
Contemporary R&B ballads
Songs written by Ne-Yo
Songs written by Mary J. Blige
2007 songs
Songs about heartache
2000s ballads